Anti-statism is any approach to social, economic or political philosophy that rejects statism. An anti-statist is one who opposes intervention by the state into personal, social and economic affairs. In anarchism, this is characterized by a complete rejection of all involuntary hierarchical rulership.

Overview 
Anti-statism is present in a variety of greatly differing positions and encompasses an array of diametric concepts and practices. Anti-statists differ greatly according to the beliefs they hold in addition to anti-statism as significant difficulty in determining whether a thinker or philosophy is anti-statist is the problem of defining the state itself.

Terminology has changed over time and past writers often used the word state in a different sense than we use it today. Anarchist Mikhail Bakunin used the term simply to mean a governing organization while other writers used the term state to mean any lawmaking or law enforcement agency. Revolutionary socialist Karl Marx defined the state as the institution used by the ruling class of a country to maintain the conditions of its rule. According to liberal Max Weber, the state is an organization with an effective legal monopoly on the legitimate use of physical force in a particular geographic area.

Topics 
 Anti-militarism is the opposition to "military rule, high military expenditure or the imposition of foreign bases". It is an opposition to statist military policy, especially nuclear armament, and is closely associated with pacifism. Anarcho-pacifism is a radical form of these principles.
 Civil disobedience is the practiced rejection of the legislative authority of the state. This is usually defined as pertaining to the relationship between the laws of the state and the citizen. Civil disobedience often aims to challenge the legitimacy of a political or judicial ruling through protest.
 Disinformation is false information spread deliberately to deceive.
 Laissez-faire is the absence of any state intervention in a market economy. The theory of  rests on the principles that economic intervention by the government is either impractical, illegitimate or both.
 Self-governance is the ability of a group or individual to exercise all necessary functions of regulation without intervention from an external authority.
 Surveillance saw the advent of technologies such as high speed surveillance computers and biometrics software. As governments now possess an unprecedented ability to monitor the activities of their subjects, many civil rights and privacy groups have expressed concern that allowing continual increases in government surveillance of citizens will end up in a mass surveillance society, with extremely limited, or non-existent political and personal freedoms.

Forms 
Besides Cynicism (contemporary) and Nihilism, there are:

Political theories 

Anti-statism is a common element in anarchist and libertarian political philosophy. Anarchism is defined by its principle aim of abolishing the state and its institutions. According to anarchist doctrine, the state is a tool of domination and coercion that is illegitimate regardless of political tendencies. On the other hand, libertarianism seeks to maximize liberty and political freedom as its core principles. This may include either a complete or partial opposition to state power, with the goal of abolishing or restricting the state.

Communist approaches to anti-statism centre on the relationship between political rule and class struggle. Karl Marx defined the state as the institution used by the ruling class of a country to maintain the conditions of its rule. To this extent, the ultimate goal of communist society was theorized as both stateless and classless.

Political movements may adopt anti-statist principles for other reasons such as aesthetic, ideological or religious beliefs, or as a result of social or political marginalization. Examples of this may include resistance movements under military occupation or a conflicting regime.

Egoism 

In egoist philosophy, self-interest is held as the grounding principle of human action, morality or both. Max Stirner proposes that most commonly accepted social institutions such as the notion of state, morality and property rights are mere illusions or ghosts in the mind. In this way, noncompliance to government authority is always justified.

Anarcho-capitalism 

Anarcho-capitalism opposes the state, instead favoring private institutions, such as markets.

See also 

 Anarchism
 Anarchism and anarcho-capitalism
 Communism
 Communist society
 Definition of anarchism and libertarianism
 Issues in anarchism
 Libertarianism
 Libertarianism in the United States
 Libertarian socialism
 State capitalism
 State interventionism
 State socialism

References 

Anarchist theory
Libertarianism
Libertarian theory
Statism